Kuron may refer to:

 Kuroń, a Polish surname
 Kūron Oshiro (born 1961), Japanese composer
 Kuron, South Sudan, a boma (administrative unit) in South Sudan
 Kuron peace village, or Holy Trinity peace village, a village in Kuron

See also